The 63rd National Film Awards was an award ceremony during which the Directorate of Film Festivals of India presented its annual National Film Awards to honour the best films of 2015 in Indian cinema. The awards were announced on 28 March 2016 and the ceremony was held on 3 May 2016.

Selection process 

The Directorate of Film Festivals invited nominations for the awards in January 2016. The acceptable last date for entries was until 13 January 2016. Feature and Non-Feature Films certified by Central Board of Film Certification between 1 January 2015, and 31 December 2015, were eligible for the film award categories. Books, critical studies, reviews or articles on cinema published in Indian newspapers, magazines, and journals between 1 January 2015, and 31 December 2015, were eligible for the best writing on cinema section.  Entries of dubbed, revised or copied versions of a film or translation, abridgements, edited or annotated works and reprints were ineligible for the awards.

For the Feature and Non-Feature Films sections, films in any Indian language, shot on 16 mm, 35 mm, a wider film gauge or a digital format, and released in cinemas, on video or digital formats for home viewing were eligible. Films were required to be certified as a feature film, a featurette or a Documentary/Newsreel/Non-Fiction by the Central Board of Film Certification.

Best Film Friendly State 
The awards aim at encouraging study and appreciation of cinema as an art form and dissemination of information and critical appreciation of this art-form through a State Government Policy.

Dadasaheb Phalke Award 

Introduced in 1969, the Dadasaheb Phalke Award is the highest award given to recognise the contributions of film personalities towards the development of Indian cinema and for distinguished contributions to the medium, its growth and promotion.

A committee consisting five eminent personalities from Indian film industry was appointed to evaluate the lifetime achievement award, Dadasaheb Phalke Award. Following were the jury members.

 Jury Members

Feature films 

Feature films will be awarded at All India as well as regional level. Following will be the awards given in each category:

Juries 

A committee headed by Ramesh Sippy was appointed to evaluate the feature films awards. Following were the jury members:

 Jury Members
 Ramesh Sippy (Chairperson)Gangai AmaranSandip DattaJohn Matthew MatthanDharam GulatiGyan SahayS. R. LeelaK. VasuSatish KaushikShyamaprasadMunin Barua

All India Award 

Following will be the awards given:

Golden Lotus Award 

Official Name: Swarna Kamal

All the awardees are awarded with 'Golden Lotus Award (Swarna Kamal)', a certificate and cash prize.

Silver Lotus Award 

Official Name: Rajat Kamal

All the awardees are awarded with 'Silver Lotus Award (Rajat Kamal)', a certificate and cash prize.

Regional Awards 

The award is given to best film in the regional languages in India.

Best Feature Film in Each of the Language Other Than Those Specified in the Schedule VIII of the Constitution

Non-Feature Films 

Short Films made in any Indian language and certified by the Central Board of Film Certification as a documentary/newsreel/fiction are eligible for non-feature film section.

Golden Lotus Award 

Official Name: Swarna Kamal

All the awardees are awarded with 'Golden Lotus Award (Swarna Kamal)', a certificate and cash prize.

Silver Lotus Award 

Official Name: Rajat Kamal

All the Awardees are awarded with 'Silver Lotus Award (Rajat Kamal)' and cash prize.

Best Writing on Cinema 

The awards aim at encouraging study and appreciation of cinema as an art form and dissemination of information and critical appreciation of this art-form through publication of books, articles, reviews etc.

Golden Lotus Award 
Official Name: Swarna Kamal

All the awardees are awarded with 'Golden Lotus Award (Swarna Kamal)' and cash prize.

References

External links 
 63rd National Film Awards: Official Catalogue
 National Film Awards Archives
 Official Page for Directorate of Film Festivals, India

National Film Awards (India) ceremonies
2015 Indian film awards